James Rose may refer to:

 James Rose, 23rd of Kilravock (1820–1909), British soldier and Lord Lieutenant of Nairn
 James C. Rose (1913–1991), landscape architect and author
 James Allen Rose (1935–2013), American model boat builder and wood craftsman
 James Rose (footballer) (born 1996), Australian rules footballer
 James Rose (bishop) (1655–1733), Scottish Episcopal clergyman
 James Rose (Australian politician) (1849–1939), Australian politician
 James A. Rose (1850–1912), American politician and educator

See also
 Jim Rose (disambiguation)